Emir Sayfullah may refer to:

Emir Sayfullah, nom de guerre of Muslim Atayev (1974-2004), Islamist leader against the Russians in the North Caucasus
Emir Sayfullah, nom de guerre of Anzor Astemirov (1976–2010), Islamist leader against the Russians in the North Caucasus
Emir Sayfullah, nom de guerre of Magomed Vagabov (1975-2010), Islamist leader against the Russians in the North Caucasus

See also
Saifullah (disambiguation)